Sotha is the oldest area of the city of Budaun, Uttar Pradesh. The locality is largely a residential area, with a majority Muslim population. A considerable number of inhabitants comes from the nearby city of Sahaswan.

Location
Iconic Shakeel Badayuni Road passes through Sotha. SH33 (Agra-Budaun-Bareilly) and Ring Road border it on opposite ends. The nearest bus stop is Lal Pul, about 600 m away. Budaun City Bus Stand is 1.5 km away and Budaun Railway Station is 2.5 km away.

Major Landmarks
Jama Masjid Shamsi
GhantaGhar
Ruins of Budaun Fort

Commercial Areas
 Greenwood Public School
 Islami Darsgah Madarsa School
 Ganga Market 
 Plaza Market

See also
Budaun
Budaun Metro Area

Budaun
Neighbourhoods in Uttar Pradesh